G.I. Joe: The Movie (also known as Action Force: The Movie in the UK) is a 1987 American direct-to-video animated military science fiction film produced as a sequel to the animated series G.I. Joe: A Real American Hero, based on the original Hasbro toyline. It was produced by Sunbow Productions and Marvel Productions and was animated in Japan by Toei Animation Co., Ltd.

Created at the height of the G.I. Joe craze in the 1980s, G.I. Joe: The Movie was intended as a theatrical release to be closely followed by The Transformers: The Movie. However, the G.I. Joe film encountered unexpected production delays which allowed the Transformers feature to be released first. Due to the poor box office performances of The Transformers: The Movie and My Little Pony: The Movie, G.I. Joe: The Movie was instead released direct-to-video as well as aired on television in syndication, first in feature-length format and later split into a five-part miniseries format as part of the series' syndication package.

Plot 
While Cobra Commander and Serpentor blame each other's stewardship of Cobra as the root cause of the organization's failures, Pythona, a woman from the secret civilization Cobra-La, infiltrates the Terror Drome. While there, she reveals to Serpentor that Cobra-La was responsible for inspiring Doctor Mindbender to create him through dream manipulation. At her urging, Serpentor plans to capture G.I. Joe's latest weapon, the Broadcast Energy Transmitter (BET).

Cobra assaults the Joes as they test the BET in the Himalayas. The Joes use the BET to activate their automated weapons systems. Serpentor is captured and Cobra Commander orders a retreat. Cobra Commander leads his troops into Cobra-La.

As the Joes celebrate their victory, a new group of rookie Joes are brought onto the team, including the allegedly clumsy kunoichi Jinx, military police officer Law and his dog Order, former basketball player Big Lob, EOD specialist Tunnel Rat, undercover officer Chuckles, and Duke's reckless half-brother, Lt. Falcon, a Green Beret.

In Cobra-La, the Joe forces are ambushed and detained within the Lovecraftian living environment. The Cobra soldiers are met by the civilization's leader Golobulus, who has Pythona and his other henchman, Nemesis Enforcer, arrest Cobra Commander. While there, Cobra learns about their history: 40,000 years ago, Cobra-La was an ancient civilization that ruled Earth. However, the Ice Age, the evolution of humans and their development of scientific technology resulted in Cobra-La's survivors being forced into caverns within the Himalayas. Cobra-La rebuilt their society in secret as centuries passed. Golobulus vowed to destroy humanity so that his people could reclaim the earth. He eventually discovered a nobleman who was working on biological weapons. The nobleman later became Cobra Commander, charged with conquering the world for Cobra-La. However, Cobra Commander's repeated failures caused Golobulus to use a Psychic Motivator on Doctor Mindbender to create Serpentor.

Meanwhile, a disguised Zarana uses Falcon to infiltrate Serpentor's holding cell. For abandoning his training, Falcon is put on guard duty by his older half-brother Duke. After Falcon abandons his post to flirt with Jinx, the Dreadnoks and Nemesis Enforcer free Serpentor, injuring Alpine, Bazooka and Gung-Ho in the process. General Hawk scolds Falcon for abandoning his post and confines him to his quarters until court-martial.

In Cobra-La, Cobra Commander is tried and Golobulus reveals his plans to launch spore pods, filled with mutative spores into space and use the BET to hatch them thus dooming humanity. He punishes Cobra Commander for his repeated failures following his trial by exposing him to the spores, which transforms Cobra Commander into a snake. He flees and makes his way to the Joes' camp with Roadblock.

Convinced by Duke to spare Falcon from a harsh punishment, General Hawk reassigns Falcon to the "Slaughter House" where he is to be retrained by Sgt. Slaughter and his "Renegades" consisting of ex-Viper Mercer, former football player Red Dog, and former acrobat Taurus. On a weaponless recon mission in the Terror Drome, the five learn of Cobra's plans and that the Baroness has discovered the location of the BET. As Falcon and the others destroy the Terror Drome, Cobra launches an assault on the Joes. The Joes launch a counterattack on Cobra, but the BET is stolen. Serpentor attempts to kill Falcon, but Duke intervenes and falls into a coma.

Falcon, the Renegades and the new recruits head to the Himalayas to stop Cobra-La. The G.I. Joe team is led to Cobra-La's lair by Cobra Commander. The new recruits prove themselves valuable soldiers as the Joes rescue their captured teammates. Falcon, Jinx and Sgt. Slaughter confront Golobulus, Pythona and Serpentor. The ensuing fight culminates in Jinx and Slaughter sending Pythona and Nemesis Enforcer falling to their apparent demise. Finally, Falcon sends Serpentor out of Cobra-La and reconfigures the BET to incinerate the spore pods in space and destroying Cobra-La. Immediately following the battle, the strike team receives news that Duke has come out of his coma and is recovering.

Voice cast 

 Charlie Adler as Low-Light
 Shuko Akune as Jinx
 Jack Angel as Wet Suit
 Jackson Beck as Narrator
 Michael Bell as Duke, Xamot, Blowtorch and Lift-Ticket
 Greg Berger as Motor-Viper
 Earl Boen as Taurus
 Arthur Burghardt as Destro and Iceberg
 Corey Burton as Tomax
 William Callaway as Beach Head
 François Chau as Quick Kick
 Peter Cullen as Zandar and Nemesis Enforcer
 Brian Cummings as Doctor Mindbender
 Jennifer Darling as Pythona
 Laurie Faso as Tunnel Rat
 Hank Garrett as Dial Tone
 Dick Gautier as Serpentor
 Ed Gilbert as General Hawk
 Dan Gilvezan as Slip Stream
 Zack Hoffman as Zartan
 Kene Holliday as Roadblock
 John Hostetter as Bazooka
 Don Johnson as Lt. Falcon
 Buster Jones as Doc
 Chris Latta as Cobra Commander, Gung Ho and Ripper
 Morgan Lofting as Baroness
 Chuck McCann as Leatherneck
 Michael McConnohie as Cross Country
 Mary Lewis as Lady Jaye
 Burgess Meredith as Golobulus
 Ron Ortiz as Law
 Rob Paulsen as Snow Job
 Pat Pinney as Mainframe
 Poncie Ponce as Red Dog
 Lisa Raggio as Zarana/Heather
 Bill Ratner as Flint
 Neil Ross as Buzzer, Dusty, Monkeywrench and Shipwreck
 Brad Sanders as Big Lob
 Ted Schwartz as Thrasher
 Sgt. Slaughter as Sgt. Slaughter
 Christopher Tabori as Mercer
 B.J. Ward as Scarlett
 Vernee Watson Johnson as Scientist
 Lee Weaver as Alpine
 Frank Welker as Torch, Wild Bill and Order
 Stan Wojno Jr. as Lifeline

Production 
The writers did not originally intend for "Cobra-La" to be the name of the rival civilization; this was merely a placeholder name in the drafts until a more alien label came to mind, but Hasbro executives fell in love with the name and forced the writers to keep it.

In the film's original script, Duke dies in battle after receiving a wound from a snake spear hurled by Serpentor. After this was written into the script, it inspired the death of the Autobot leader Optimus Prime in The Transformers: The Movie while both films were in production. However, Optimus Prime's death sparked a severe backlash among both fans and parents, and Hasbro reversed their decision on allowing Duke's death. While the scene was kept, replacement dialogue was inserted stating that Duke had gone into a coma. In the film's ending, it is stated that he had come out of the coma. Writer and story editor Buzz Dixon said in an interview with JoeHeadquarters.com, "[If] you watch the visuals and don't listen to the soundtrack, it's obvious Duke dies." In the original script, the Joes also held his funeral prior to the final battle.

Home media 
Rhino Entertainment/Kid Rhino Entertainment first released the film on DVD on June 20, 2000, with 5.1 remastered and remixed “Rhinophonic” sound and contains some extra features. Shout! Factory released a remastered special edition on DVD and Blu-ray on July 27, 2010, featuring audio commentary from story consultant (and series writer) Buzz Dixon, and a printable copy of the original screenplay.

References

External links 
 
 
 

1980s American animated films
1980s science fiction adventure films
1987 animated films
1987 direct-to-video films
1987 films
American children's animated adventure films
American children's animated science fiction films
Animated films based on animated series
Direct-to-video animated films
Films about terrorism
Films based on television series
Films set in Asia
Films set in the Himalayas
Films scored by Johnny Douglas
Films scored by Robert J. Walsh
Films with screenplays by Ron Friedman
G.I. Joe (franchise) animated films
Marvel Productions films
Sunbow Entertainment films
Toei Animation films
1980s English-language films